Frits Goldschmeding (born 2 August 1933) is a Dutch billionaire businessman, founder of Randstad Holding, the world's largest staffing company. The Netherlands-based company had revenue of 23.7 billion euros ($26.5 billion) in 2019.

Early life
Goldschmeding was born on 2 August 1933. He has a doctorate from VU University Amsterdam.

Career
He founded Uitzendbureau Amstelveen (later Randstad) with fellow economics student Ger Daleboudt in 1960, while studying at Amsterdam's Vrije University. The two came up with the idea for the business as they were cycling back from a fraternity party at 2:00 a.m. They established their first office in their dorm room. In 1964, they renamed it Randstad. Goldschmeding took Randstad public in 1990, and in 2008, merged it with the Dutch group Vedior. According to Forbes, Goldschmeding has a 35% stake in the company, and a net worth of $4.2 billion, as of October 2019.

Goldschmeding was also a professor at the Centre for Entrepreneurship at Nyenrode Business University.

Personal life
Married with three children, Goldschmeding lives in Amsterdam, Netherlands.

See also 
 List of Dutch by net worth

References

 

Randstad NV people
1933 births
Living people
Dutch billionaires
Dutch company founders
Academic staff of Nyenrode Business University
Businesspeople from Amsterdam
Vrije Universiteit Amsterdam alumni